The Japanese archipelago (Japanese: , Nihon rettō) is a group of 14,125 islands that form the country of Japan. The Kuril Island Arc, the Daitō Islands, and the Nanpō Islands are not parts of the archipelago.

Terminology
The term "mainland Japan" is used to distinguish the large islands of the Japanese archipelago from the remote, smaller islands; it refers to the main islands of Hokkaido, Honshu, Kyushu and Shikoku. From 1943 until the end of the Pacific War, Karafuto Prefecture was designated part of the mainland.

The term "home islands" was used at the end of World War II to define the area where Japanese sovereignty and constitutional rule of its emperor would be restricted. The term is also commonly used today to distinguish the archipelago from Japan's colonies and other territories.

Palaeogeography

Geography

The archipelago consists of 14,125 islands (here defined as land more than 100 m in circumference), of which 430 are inhabited. The five main islands, from north to south, are Hokkaido, Honshu, Shikoku, Kyushu, and Okinawa. Honshu is the largest and referred to as the Japanese mainland.

The topography is divided as:
Hokkaido, Honshu, and Shikoku and its surrounding islands;
Kyushu and the Ryukyu arc, which is composed of the Ryukyu Islands and other surrounding islands;
Eastern part of Hokkaido and the Kuril Islands;
Nanpō Islands and the Izu Peninsula (part of Izu-Bonin-Mariana Arc).

Image gallery

See also
Japan in the Paleolithic
List of islands of Japan
Extreme points of Japan

References

 
Archipelagoes of the Pacific Ocean
Archipelago
Archipelago